Ed Zeman (born September 25, 1963) is a former professional American football player who attended Fort Lewis College. In 1987, he was a member of the Los Angeles Rams of the NFL. In 1988, he played for the Los Angeles Cobras of the Arena Football League.

References

Los Angeles Rams players
Los Angeles Cobras players
1963 births
Living people
American football defensive backs
Fort Lewis Skyhawks football players